Reshit Chochmah  is an important book of Kabbalah (Jewish mysticism), ethics and morality (Musar literature), written by the 16th century scholar Rabbi Eliyahu de Vidas. It is based largely on the Zohar. Its name literally translates into “the beginning of Wisdom”, in allusion to the Biblical verse "The fear of the Lord is the beginning of wisdom".

Overview

Reshit Chochmah describes a method of meditation that combines visualization and permutation of Hebrew letters, and is intended to inspire the reader with a sense of purity and holiness, if studied on a regular basis. The book presents a combination of ethical and moral teaching with Kabbalah. The book shows the path to the uninitiated to enter the world and wisdom of Kabbalah. In a very easy and understandable style, the book explains to the reader the ways to attain the higher level of Divine awareness which the Holy One wishes for His beloved people, Israel.

The book has continued to be popular ever since its publication.

Kabbalah texts
Hebrew-language names
Kabbalistic words and phrases
Sifrei Kodesh